Yunnanilus macrolepis is a species of stone loach which is endemic to China. Its type locality is Luoping County in Yunnan. Some authorities consider Y. macrolepis to be a junior synonym of Yunnanilus paludosus.

References

M
Taxa named by Li Wie-Xian
Fish described in 2000